María Isabel Merlo Talavera (born 30 December 1960) is a Mexican politician from the Institutional Revolutionary Party. From 2009 to 2012 he served as Deputy of the LXI Legislature of the Mexican Congress representing Puebla. He also served as a local deputy in the LVI Legislature of the Congress of Puebla and as the municipal president of Huaquechula from 1996 to 1999.

References

1960 births
Living people
Politicians from Puebla
Women members of the Chamber of Deputies (Mexico)
Members of the Congress of Puebla
Municipal presidents in Puebla
Institutional Revolutionary Party politicians
20th-century Mexican politicians
20th-century Mexican women politicians
21st-century Mexican politicians
21st-century Mexican women politicians
Deputies of the LXI Legislature of Mexico
Members of the Chamber of Deputies (Mexico) for Puebla